Legende or Légende may refer to:
 Légende (Cras), a work for cello and piano by Jean Cras
 Légende (Enescu), a work for solo trumpet and piano by George Enescu
 Légende (Wieniawski), a showpiece by the Polish violin virtuoso Henryk Wieniawski
 Légende Films, a production company
 Legende 1 Ton, a French racing sailboat design

See also 
 Legend (disambiguation)